Phosvitin is one of the egg (commonly hen's egg) yolk phosphoproteins known for being the most phosphorylated protein found in nature. Phosvitin isolation was first described by Mecham and Olcott in the year 1949. Recently it has been shown that disordered secondary structure of phosvitin orchestrates nucleation and growth of biomimetic bone like apatite.

References

Further reading

Glycoproteins
Phosphoproteins